The Music Bank Chart is a record chart established in 1998 on the South Korean KBS television music program Music Bank. Every week during its live broadcast, the show gives an award for the best-performing single on the South Korean chart. The chart includes digital performances on domestic online music services (65%), album sales (5%), number of times the single was broadcast on KBS TV (20%), and viewers' choice  from online surveys (10%), a methodology that has been used since November 2020. The score for domestic online music services is calculated using data from Melon, Bugs, Genie Music, Naver Vibe and Flo. Oh My Girl member Arin and Tomorrow X Together member Choi Soo-bin had hosted the show since July 2020 and continued to do so until October 1, 2021. Enhypen member Park Sung-hoon and Ive member Jang Won-young were announced as new hosts the following week.

In 2021, 40 singles reached number one on the chart, and 30 acts were awarded first-place trophies. The year began with "Dynamite" by BTS at number one; it had been in the top spot on the last chart of 2020. The single, along with "Celebrity" by IU, won four trophies each, making both singles the most-awarded songs of the year. "Permission to Dance" by BTS had the highest score of the year, with 11,145 points on the July 23 broadcast. BTS had three number one singles on the chart in 2021 achieved with "Dynamite", "Butter" and "Permission to Dance", the most of any act in 2021. The three songs spent a total of eight weeks atop the chart, making BTS the act with the most wins of the year. Brave Girls won their first Music Bank award for "Rollin' over four years after its release after a YouTube video featuring performances of the song went viral, making it rise on South Korean music charts.

Blackpink member Rosé received her first number one trophy on Music Bank for her debut single "On the Ground" on the March 26 broadcast. Fellow member Lisa achieved her first ever trophy as a soloist for her debut single "Lalisa". The single broke two Guinness World Records for the most viewed YouTube music video by a solo artist in 24 hours and most viewed YouTube music video in 24 hours by a solo K-pop artist, the latter of which was previously held by Rosé. Lisa was one of a number of soloists who achieved their first career music show wins in 2021, along with Exo member D.O., whose debut single "Rose" spent one week at number one in August, and TVXQ member U-Know Yunho, who gained his first number one as a soloist when "Thank U" debuted at number one on the January 29 chart.

Chart history

See also 
 List of Inkigayo Chart winners (2021)
 List of M Countdown Chart winners (2021)
 List of Show Champion Chart winners (2021)
 List of Show! Music Core Chart winners (2021)
 List of The Show Chart winners (2021)

Notes

References 

2021 in South Korean music
2021 record charts
Lists of number-one songs in South Korea